Democratic National Alliance may refer to:
Democratic National Alliance (Bahamas)
Democratic National Alliance (Sri Lanka)
Democratic National Alliance (Trinidad and Tobago)
Democratic People's Alliance or Democratic National Alliance, Bosnia and Herzegovina